The Battle of Bassianae was a battle between the Ostrogoths and the Huns in 468. Recovering from the defeat at Nedao in 454, the Hunnic leader Dengizich launched an invasion across the Danube with a large Hun force, but was defeated by the Ostrogothic king Valamir. Jordanes writes that in turn the Huns "for ever after" left the Goths in peace.

References

460s conflicts
Battles involving the Huns
Battles involving the Ostrogoths
Military history of Serbia
468